Céline Beigbeder (born 25 February 1975) is a former professional tennis player from France.

Biography
Beigbeder was born in Bayonne in south-western France, the daughter of Jean-Pierre and Nicole. The highlights of her junior career include winning the French national championships in 1993 and making the Orange Bowl quarterfinals in 1994. Her coach and educator was Jean Michel Etchebarne. Finishing school in 1994, she competed for several years on the ITF Circuit.

It wasn't until 2001, aged 26, that she committed to professional tennis full-time. At her first WTA Tour tournament, the 2001 Internationaux de Strasbourg, she made it into the main draw as a qualifier and reached the semifinals, with wins over Tamarine Tanasugarn, Sarah Pitkowski and Ai Sugiyama. She was granted a wildcard into the 2001 French Open and was beaten in the first round by Elena Dementieva. Her five ITF titles in 2001 included two $50k events as well as a win over Jelena Jankovic en route to the title at Lenzerheide. By the end of the year, her ranking had risen to No. 101 in the world.

In 2002, she broke into the world's top 100, peaking at No. 84 in April, with main-draw appearances at the Australian Open, French Open and in Wimbledon. She was a quarterfinalist that year at both the Copa Colsanitas and Palermo International.

ITF finals

Singles: 11 (9–2)

Doubles: 1 (1–0)

References

External links
 
 
 

1975 births
Living people
French female tennis players
Sportspeople from Bayonne